Casino is a town in the Northern Rivers area of New South Wales, Australia, with a population of 10,914 people at the . It lies on the banks of the Richmond River and is situated at the junction of the Bruxner Highway and the Summerland Way.

Overview 
Casino is the seat of the Richmond Valley Council, a local government area.

Settlement of the area began in 1840 when pastoral squatters George Robert Stapleton and his business partner, Mr. Clay, set up a cattle station which they initially called Cassino after Cassino (near Monte Cassino) in Italy. The town now has a sister city agreement with the Italian village.

Casino is among Australia's largest beef centres. It is the regional hub of a very large cattle industry and positions itself as the "Beef Capital" of Australia, although the city of Rockhampton also claims this title. In addition it is the service centre for a rich agricultural area.

Each year the town celebrates Casino Beef Week. It was not held in 2007 but since that year, has continued to be held and celebrated with the 2019 one being held from 18 to 28 May.
The Richmond River runs through the town separating South Casino from the rest of the town.

Climate
Casino experiences a humid subtropical climate (Köppen: Cfa, Trewartha: Cfal), with hot, humid summers and mild, comfortably dry winters.

Population
According to the 2016 census of Population, there were 10,914 people in Casino.
 Aboriginal and Torres Strait Islander people made up 10.5% of the population. 
 86.8% of people were born in Australia. The next most common country of birth was England at 1.2%.   
 90.9% of people spoke only English at home. 
 The most common responses for religion were Catholic 25.2%, Anglican 22.8% and No Religion 22.0%.

Transport 
Casino railway station is situated on the main North Coast railway line between Sydney and Brisbane, north of Grafton. A branch line ran via Lismore to Murwillumbah; that line has since been closed, although lobbying is taking place to re-open it. Casino railway station is the terminus of the daily Casino XPT from Sydney and there is a daily service to and from Brisbane via the Brisbane XPT.

In the 1920s, a never completed railway branch line to Bonalbo was started. A line was also proposed from Casino via Tabulam and even a line all the way to Tenterfield,

A Miniature Railway is situated next to the Casino Golf Club. The railway operates on Sundays between 10am and 4pm on a 2.5km stretch of track, with a museum at the end. A round trip is usually 25 minutes however on busier days it can vary. 

Casino is serviced by Lismore Airport with several daily flights to Sydney.

Northern Rivers Buslines operates rural services to Lismore (670) and Kyogle (675) each weekday, with one return service to Tenterfield available on Monday, Wednesday and Friday.

Casino Bus Service operates local town loops, including a loop service to Gays Hill.

Among its many schools are the main ones: Casino High School, Casino Public School, Casino West Public School, St. Mary's Primary School, St. Mary's Catholic College School and Casino Christian Community School.

Heritage listings
Casino has a number of heritage-listed sites, including:
 102 Barker Street: Casino Post Office
 Casino-Murwillumbah railway: Old Casino railway station
 North Coast railway: Casino railway station

Location for filming
The 2014 drama series The Gods of Wheat Street was set and partly filmed in Casino.

Notable people
Ian Callinan (born 1937), High Court judge
 Pat Darling (1913–2007), nurse and author
 John Elford (born 1946), rugby league player
 Jeff Fatt (born 1953), musician and actor, one of The Wiggles
 Thomas George (born 1949), politician
 Clark Irving (born 1808), early settler (pastoralist) and politician
 Ben Kennedy (born 1974), rugby league player
 Matt King (born 1980), rugby league player
 Tess Mallos (1933–2012), food journalist and author
 Chris Munce (born 1969), horse racing jockey
 Michael Robotham (born 1960), crime novelist
 David Russell, (born 1982), racing driver
 Brian Smith (born 1954), rugby league player and coach (attended Casino High School)
 Tony Smith (born 1967), rugby league coach, brother of Brian Smith, grew up in Casino attending Casino High School
 Albert Torrens (born 1976), rugby league player
 Cody Walker (born 1990), rugby league player
 Henry Wallace Browning O.A.M. (born Casino 1928), lawn bowler, IBD World Champion 2007 Guinness World Record 2008 Hall of Fame Bankstown Casino High School 1940 to 1943

 Damien Wright (born 1975), cricket player

See also 
 Arthur Percy Sullivan (1896–1937), Victoria Cross recipient, worked at a bank in Casino during the 1930s.
 Ruby Langford Ginibi (1934-2011) attended Casino High School, author and historian 
 The song "I've Been Everywhere" references Casino in its second verse.
 List of never used railways

References

External links 

General travel information on Casino from The Sydney Morning Herald
Casino – Visit NSW

 
Towns in New South Wales
Northern Rivers
Richmond Valley Council